Abu Osama al-Tunisi (d. ) is a citizen of Tunisia believed to have played one of the most
important leadership role in Al Qaeda in Iraq. The United States reported that he, and two of his aides, were killed by air strikes.

References

External links

Tunisian al-Qaeda members
Year of birth missing
2007 deaths
Deaths by American airstrikes